Least-squares adjustment is a model for the solution of an overdetermined system of equations based on the principle of least squares of observation residuals. It is used extensively in the disciplines of surveying, geodesy, and photogrammetry—the field of geomatics, collectively.

Formulation
There are three forms of least squares adjustment: parametric, conditional, and combined:
 In parametric adjustment, one can find an observation equation h(X)=Y relating observations Y explicitly in terms of parameters X (leading to the A-model below).
 In conditional adjustment, there exists a condition equation which is g(Y)=0 involving only observations Y (leading to the B-model below) — with no parameters X at all.
 Finally, in a combined adjustment, both parameters X and observations Y are involved implicitly in a mixed-model equation f(X,Y)=0.
Clearly, parametric and conditional adjustments correspond to the more general combined case when f(X,Y)=h(X)-Y and f(X,Y)=g(Y), respectively. Yet the special cases warrant simpler solutions, as detailed below. Often in the literature, Y may be denoted L.

Solution
The equalities above only hold for the estimated parameters  and observations , thus . In contrast, measured observations  and approximate parameters  produce a nonzero misclosure:

One can proceed to Taylor series expansion of the equations, which results in the Jacobians or design matrices: the first one,

and the second one,

The linearized model then reads:

In the parametric adjustment, the second design matrix is an identity, B=-I, and the misclosure vector can be interpreted as the pre-fit residuals, so the system simplifies to:

which is in the form of ordinary least squares. 
In the conditional adjustment, the first design matrix is null, A=0.
For the more general cases, Lagrange multipliers are introduced to relate the two Jacobian matrices and transform the constrained least squares problem into an unconstrained one (albeit a larger one).

Computation
Given the matrices and vectors above, their solution is found via standard least-squares methods; e.g., forming the normal matrix and applying Cholesky decomposition, applying the QR factorization directly to the Jacobian matrix, iterative methods for very large systems, etc.

Worked-out examples

Applications
 Leveling, traverse, and control networks
 Bundle adjustment
 Triangulation, Trilateration, Triangulateration
 GPS/GNSS positioning
 Helmert transformation

Related concepts
Parametric adjustment is similar to most of regression analysis and coincides with the Gauss–Markov model
Combined adjustment, also known as the Gauss–Helmert model (named after German mathematicians/geodesists C.F. Gauss and F.R. Helmert), is related to the errors-in-variables models and total least squares.
The use of a priori parameter covariance matrix is akin to Tikhonov regularization

Extensions
If rank deficiency is encountered, it can often be rectified by the inclusion of additional equations imposing constraints on the parameters and/or observations, leading to constrained least squares.

References

Bibliography

Lecture notes and technical reports
Nico Sneeuw and Friedhelm Krum, "Adjustment theory", Geodätisches Institut, Universität Stuttgart, 2014
Krakiwsky, "A synthesis of recent advances in the method of least squares", Lecture Notes #42, Department of Geodesy and Geomatics Engineering, University of New Brunswick, 1975
Cross, P.A. "Advanced least squares applied to position-fixing", University of East London, School of Surveying, Working Paper No. 6, January 1994. First edition April 1983, Reprinted with corrections January 1990. (Original Working Papers, North East London Polytechnic, Dept. of Surveying, 205 pp., 1983.)
Snow, Kyle B., Applications of Parameter Estimation and Hypothesis Testing to GPS Network Adjustments, Division of Geodetic Science, Ohio State University, 2002

Books and chapters
 Friedrich Robert Helmert. Die Ausgleichsrechnung nach der Methode der kleinsten Quadrate (Adjustment computation based on the method of least squares). Leipzig: Teubner, 1872. <http://eudml.org/doc/203764>.
 Reino Antero Hirvonen, "Adjustments by least squares in geodesy and photogrammetry", Ungar, New York. 261 p., 1971.
Edward M. Mikhail, Friedrich E. Ackermann, "Observations and least squares", University Press of America, 1982

 Peter Vaníček and E.J. Krakiwsky, "Geodesy: The Concepts." Amsterdam: Elsevier. (third ed.): , ; chap. 12, "Least-squares solution of overdetermined models", pp. 202–213, 1986.
 Gilbert Strang and Kai Borre, "Linear Algebra, Geodesy, and GPS", SIAM, 624 pages, 1997.
Paul Wolf and Bon DeWitt, "Elements of Photogrammetry with Applications in GIS", McGraw-Hill, 2000
Karl-Rudolf Koch, "Parameter Estimation and Hypothesis Testing in Linear Models", 2a ed., Springer, 2000
P.J.G. Teunissen, "Adjustment theory, an introduction", Delft Academic Press, 2000
Edward M. Mikhail, James S. Bethel, J. Chris McGlone, "Introduction to Modern Photogrammetry", Wiley, 2001
Harvey, Bruce R., "Practical least squares and statistics for surveyors", Monograph 13, Third Edition, School of Surveying and Spatial Information Systems, University of New South Wales, 2006
Huaan Fan, "Theory of Errors and Least Squares Adjustment", Royal Institute of Technology (KTH), Division of Geodesy and Geoinformatics, Stockholm, Sweden, 2010, .

Charles D. Ghilani, "Adjustment Computations: Spatial Data Analysis", John Wiley & Sons, 2011
Charles D. Ghilani and Paul R. Wolf, "Elementary Surveying: An Introduction to Geomatics", 13th Edition, Prentice Hall, 2011
Erik Grafarend and Joseph Awange, "Applications of Linear and Nonlinear Models: Fixed Effects, Random Effects, and Total Least Squares", Springer, 2012
Alfred Leick, Lev Rapoport, and Dmitry Tatarnikov, "GPS Satellite Surveying", 4th Edition, John Wiley & Sons, ; Chapter 2, "Least-Squares Adjustments", pp. 11–79, doi:10.1002/9781119018612.ch2
A. Fotiou (2018) "A Discussion on Least Squares Adjustment with Worked Examples" In: Fotiou A., D. Rossikopoulos, eds. (2018): “Quod erat demonstrandum. In quest for the ultimate geodetic insight.” Special issue for Professor Emeritus Athanasios Dermanis. Publication of the  School of Rural and Surveying Engineering, Aristotle University of Thessaloniki, 405 pages.  
John Olusegun Ogundare (2018), "Understanding Least Squares Estimation and Geomatics Data Analysis", John Wiley & Sons, 720 pages, .
 

Curve fitting
Least squares
Geodesy
Surveying
Photogrammetry